Ab Kuch (also Romanized as Āb Kūch) is a village in Hanza Rural District, Hanza District, Rabor County, Kerman Province, Iran. At the 2006 census, its population was 244, in 39 families.

References 

Populated places in Rabor County